Papanin (Russian: Папанин; masculine) or Papanina (feminine) may refer to
 Ivan Papanin (1894–1986), Soviet polar explorer and scientist
Ivan Papanin (icebreaker), a Russian icebreaking patrol ship
Papanin Nunataks, a group of ridges in Antarctica
Papanin, a village in Belarus